Stephen Lawrence Schwartz (born March 6, 1948) is an American musical theatre lyricist and composer. In a career spanning over five decades, Schwartz has written such hit musicals as Godspell (1971), Pippin (1972), and Wicked (2003). He has contributed lyrics to a number of successful films, including Pocahontas (1995), The Hunchback of Notre Dame (1996), The Prince of Egypt (1998, music and lyrics), and Enchanted (2007). Schwartz has won the Drama Desk Award for Outstanding Lyrics, three Grammy Awards, three Academy Awards, and has been nominated for six Tony Awards.  He received the 2015 Isabelle Stevenson Award, a special Tony Award, for his commitment to serving artists and fostering new talent.

Early life and education
Schwartz was born to a Jewish family in New York City, the son of Sheila Lorna (née Siegel), a teacher, and Stanley Leonard Schwartz, a businessman. He grew up in the Williston Park area of Nassau County, New York, where he graduated from Mineola High School in 1964. While attending Carnegie Mellon University, Schwartz composed and directed an early version of Pippin (entitled Pippin, Pippin) with the student-run theatre group, Scotch'n'Soda. Schwartz graduated from Carnegie Mellon University in 1968 with a Bachelor of Fine Arts in drama.

Early career
Upon returning to New York City, Schwartz went to work as a producer for RCA Records, but shortly thereafter began to work in Broadway theatre. He was asked to be the musical director of the first American rock opera, The Survival of St. Joan. He was credited as the producer of the double album of the soundtrack with the progressive rock group Smoke Rise on Paramount Records. His first major credit was the title song for the play Butterflies Are Free; the song was eventually used in the movie version as well.

In 1971, he wrote music and lyrics for Godspell, for which he won several awards, including two Grammys. For this musical's Toronto production in 1972, he asked Paul Shaffer to be the musical director, thus starting Shaffer's career. Godspell was followed by the English-language texts, in collaboration with Leonard Bernstein, for Bernstein's Mass, which opened the John F. Kennedy Center for the Performing Arts in Washington, DC. In 1972, the long-running Pippin premiered on Broadway. Schwartz had begun writing songs for Pippin while in college, although none of the songs from the college version ended up in the Broadway production. Both Pippin and Godspell continue to be frequently produced.

Two years after Pippin debuted, Schwartz wrote music and lyrics of The Magic Show, which ran for just under 2,000 performances. By mid-1974, at age 26, Schwartz had three smash hit musicals playing in New York simultaneously. Next were the music and lyrics of The Baker's Wife, which closed before reaching Broadway after an out-of-town tryout tour in 1976. However, the cast album went on to attain cult status, which led to several subsequent productions, including a London production directed by Trevor Nunn in 1990 and another at the Paper Mill Playhouse in New Jersey in 2005.

In 1978, Schwartz's next Broadway project was a musical version of Studs Terkel's Working, which he adapted and directed, winning the Drama Desk Award as best director, and for which he contributed four songs. He also co-directed the television production, which was presented as part of the PBS American Playhouse series. In 1977, Schwartz wrote a children's book called The Perfect Peach. In the 1980s, Schwartz wrote songs for a one-act musical for children, The Trip, which 20 years later was revised, expanded and produced as Captain Louie. He then wrote music for three of the songs of the Off-Broadway revue Personals, and lyrics to Charles Strouse's music for the musical Rags.

Later career
In 1991, Schwartz wrote the music and lyrics for the musical Children of Eden. He then began working in film, collaborating with composer Alan Menken on the scores for the Disney animated features Pocahontas (1995), for which he received two Academy Awards, and The Hunchback of Notre Dame (1996). He provided songs for DreamWorks' first animated feature, The Prince of Egypt (1998), winning another Academy Award for the song "When You Believe". He wrote music and lyrics for the original television musical, Geppetto (2000), seen on The Wonderful World of Disney. A stage adaptation of this piece premiered in June 2006 at The Coterie Theatre in Kansas City, Missouri, and was titled Geppetto and Son, and is now known as Disney's My Son Pinocchio: Geppetto's Musical Tale. A version created for young performers, titled Geppetto & Son, Jr. had its world premiere on July 17, 2009, at the Lyric Theatre in Stuart, Florida. It was presented by the StarStruck Performing Arts Center.

In 2003, Schwartz returned to Broadway, as composer and lyricist for Wicked, a musical based on the novel Wicked: The Life and Times of the Wicked Witch of the West, which tells the story of the Oz characters from the point of view of the witches. Schwartz won a Grammy Award for his work as composer and lyricist and producer of Wicked'''s cast recording. On March 23, 2006, the Broadway production of Wicked passed the 1,000 performance mark, making Schwartz one of four composers (the other three being Andrew Lloyd Webber, Jerry Herman, and Richard Rodgers) to have three shows last that long on Broadway (the other two were Pippin and The Magic Show). In 2007, Schwartz joined Jerry Herman as being one of only two composer/lyricists to have three shows run longer than 1,500 performances on Broadway.

After Wicked, Schwartz contributed music and lyrics for a new musical that was commissioned to celebrate the bicentennial of the birth of Hans Christian Andersen. The production, titled Mit Eventyr or "My Fairytale", opened at the Gladsaxe Theatre in Copenhagen in the fall of 2005. The American premiere of My Fairytale took place in the summer of 2011 at the PCPA Theatrefest of California and was directed by the composer's son Scott Schwartz.

Schwartz returned to Hollywood in 2007 and wrote lyrics for the hit Disney film Enchanted, again collaborating with Menken. Three songs from the film, "Happy Working Song", "That's How You Know", and "So Close", were nominated for the Academy Award for Best Original Song. He has written the theme song for the Playhouse Disney show Johnny and the Sprites, starring John Tartaglia. A recent project is incidental music for his son Scott Schwartz's adaptation of Willa Cather's My Ántonia.

On several occasions prior to 2008, Schwartz had reached out to Tim Dang who was the longtime artistic director of Los Angeles-based Asian-Pacific Islander theater company, East West Players (EWP). This collaboration led to the conception of a new version of Pippin, aesthetically inspired by Japanese anime and musically inspired by hip-hop. The production was a record-breaking hit and remained the highest grossing production in EWP's history for an entire decade before being dethroned by Allegiance in 2018.

In 2008, Applause Theatre and Cinema Books published the first ever Schwartz biography titled Defying Gravity, by Carol de Giere. The book is a comprehensive look at his career and life, and includes sections on how to write for the musical theatre.

Turning to the pop world in 2009, Schwartz collaborated with John Ondrasik in writing two songs on the Five for Fighting album Slice, the title track as well as "Above the Timberline". Ondrasik became familiar with Schwartz based on his daughter's affection for, and repeated attendance at performances of, the musical Wicked.

In September 2011, the Northlight Theatre in Chicago premiered Schwartz's new musical, Snapshots, which featured music and lyrics by Schwartz, book by David Stern, and was directed by Ken Sawyer. It blended together "some of the best-loved music with some of the genuinely wonderful lesser known gems of (the) renowned Broadway composer."

On March 22, 2012, the San Francisco Gay Men's Chorus released "Testimony", composed by Schwartz with lyrics taken from submissions to Dan Savage's It Gets Better Project.

In March 2015, Princess Cruises announced a partnership with Schwartz for the development of four shows over three years.  The first will be a magic themed review of Schwartz's music, titled Magic To Do, including one new song written for the show.

Schwartz returned to write the lyrics for a sequel to Enchanted, titled Disenchanted, and will do the same for a live-action remake of The Hunchback of Notre Dame.

In April 2020 Schwartz participated in a fund-raising video called Saturday Night Seder which featured an "all-star" cast of performers, composers and religious leaders broadcasting from their home computers and cellphones due to the practice of "social distancing" forced on people around the world in response to the coronavirus/COVID-19 pandemic. The video explained the story of Passover through stories, song, comedy and memories, and raised money for the CDC Foundation.

Personal life
Schwartz married Carole Piasecki on June 6, 1969. They have two children, Jessica and Scott.

In 2009 Schwartz was elected president of the Dramatists Guild of America, succeeding John Weidman; he stepped down in 2014, to be succeeded by Doug Wright.

Major works

Stage
Butterflies Are Free (1969) - title song (play and movie)
Godspell (1971) - composer, lyricist
Mass (1971) - English texts (in collaboration with Leonard Bernstein)
Pippin (1972) - composer, lyricist
The Magic Show (1974) - composer, lyricist
The Baker's Wife (1976) - composer, lyricist
Working (1978) - adaptation, direction, composer, lyricist of 4 songs
Personals (1985) - composer of 3 songs
The Trip (1986) - children's show; composer, lyricist
Rags (1986) - lyricist
Children of Eden (1991) - composer, lyricist
Der Glöckner von Notre Dame (1999 Berlin) - lyricist to Alan Menken (stage version of Disney's The Hunchback of Notre Dame); Michael Kunze translated the lyrics to German; English version in 2013
Wicked (2003) - composer, lyricist
Tiruvasakam (2005) - English translation of selected verses of the Tamil hymn on Lord Siva by Manickavasagar; Indian composer Ilaiyaraaja wrote the music.
Snapshots (2005)
Captain Louie (2005)
Mit Eventyr – My Fairy Tale (2005) - contributed 6 songs
Séance on a Wet Afternoon (2009) - opera
Schikaneder (2016 Vienna)
The Prince of Egypt (2017) - composer, lyricist, based on the film

Recordings
Reluctant Pilgrim (1997)
Uncharted Territory (2001)

Books 

 Defying Gravity (2008) - biography

Film
Godspell (1973) - composer, lyricist
Pocahontas (1995) - lyricist
The Hunchback of Notre Dame (1996) - lyricist
The Prince of Egypt (1998) - composer, lyricist
Enchanted (2007) - lyricist
Disenchanted (2022) - lyricist
Spellbound (2023) - lyricist
Wicked: Part One (2024) - co-screenwriter, composer, lyricist
Wicked: Part Two (2025) - co-screenwriter, composer, lyricist
The Hunchback of Notre Dame - lyricist
Marley - composer, lyricist

Television
Working - director
Geppetto (2000) - composer, lyricist
Johnny and the Sprites (2005) - theme song

Choral
The Chanukah Song (We are Lights)
Kéramos
Thiruvasakam in Symphony (2005)
Testimony (2012)

Awards and nominations

Schwartz has won many major awards in his field, including three Oscars, three Grammys, four Drama Desk Awards, one Golden Globe Award, the Richard Rodgers Award for Excellence in Musical Theater and a self-described "tiny handful of tennis trophies".

He has received six Tony Award nominations, for Wicked, Pippin, and Godspell, music/lyrics; Rags, lyrics; and Working, music/lyrics and book. In 2015, he received an honorary Tony Award, the Isabelle Stevenson Award, for his commitment to serving artists and fostering new talent.

In April 2008, Schwartz was given a star on the Hollywood Walk of Fame. In 2009, he was inducted into the Songwriters Hall of Fame. Also in 2009, he was inducted into the American Theater Hall of Fame. The induction ceremony took place on the night of January 25, 2010.

Schwartz received an Honorary Doctor of Fine Arts degree from Carnegie Mellon University in May 2015.

References

Sources
 Anderson, Ruth. Contemporary American composers. A biographical dictionary, 1st edition, G. K. Hall, 1976.
 Green, Stanley; Taylor, Deems. The world of musical comedy. The story of the American musical stage. As told through the careers of its foremost composers and lyricist, A. S. Barnes, 1980.
 Kasha, Al. Notes on Broadway. Conversations with the great songwriters, Books, Inc., 1985.
 Press, Jaques Cattell (Ed.). ASCAP Biographical Dictionary of Composers, Authors and Publishers, fourth edition, R. R. Bowker, 1980.
 Suskin, Steven. Show tunes 1905–1991. The songs, shows and careers of Broadway's major composers, Limelight Editions, 1992.

External links

Stephen Schwartz official fan site
The Schwartz Scene blog with podcasts of Stephen Schwartz talks
Stephen Schwartz Interview for MusicalTalk
Stephen Schwartz's audition tips at MusicalSingers.com
Musical writing tips from Stephen Schwartz at MusicalWriters.com
Interview with Stephen Schwartz in International Songwriters Association's "Songwriter Magazine"

American musical theatre composers
American musical theatre lyricists
American lyricists
Jewish American composers
Jewish American songwriters
Annie Award winners
Best Original Song Academy Award-winning songwriters
Best Original Music Score Academy Award winners
Carnegie Mellon University College of Fine Arts alumni
Golden Globe Award-winning musicians
Grammy Award winners
Juilliard School alumni
People from Williston Park, New York
Songwriters from New York (state)
Walt Disney Animation Studios people
1948 births
Living people
Animation composers
Broadway composers and lyricists
Male musical theatre composers